Adolf I von Nassau (born Adolf von Nassau-Wiesbaden-Idstein, –6 February 1390) was Bishop of Speyer 1371–1388 and Archbishop of Mainz 1381–1390.

Life 

Adolf was born  as son of Count Adolf I, the Count of Nassau-Wiesbaden-Idstein. His grandfather was Adolf, King of the Romans. Adolf was made Bishop of Speyer instead, a position freed up because  moved from Speyer to the previous position of Johann and became Bishop of Strasbourg. When Johann died in 1373, the Mainz Cathedral chapter again supported Adolf, but on the request of Emperor Charles IV, Gregory XI appointed Louis of Meissen. However, Adolf had actual control over most of the Electorate of Mainz. After the death of Gregory XI, Adolf used the Western Schism and had himself confirmed by the Avignon pope Clement VII. In 1381, Adolf was accepted as archbishop of Mainz also by the Roman pope Urban VI and by Charles IV's successor as King of the Germans, Wenceslaus IV. 

During his reign, Adolf was in conflict with Rupert I, Elector Palatine, a supporter of the Roman papacy. Adolf used his position to further his family's territorial interests and to enlarge its power. On Adolf's initiative, the creation of the University of Erfurt was confirmed by Pope Urban VI in 1389. Adolf died on 6 February 1390 in Heiligenstadt. He is buried in Mainz Cathedral.

References

Bibliography 

 
 
 

1350s births
1390 deaths
Roman Catholic bishops of Speyer
Archbishops of Mainz
Sons of monarchs